Nonthaburi Pier or Nonthaburi Pier (Pibul 3) (often called short: ท่าน้ำนนท์), with designated pier number N30, is a pier on Chao Phraya River located in the Tambon Suan Yai, Amphoe Mueang Nonthaburi, Nonthaburi Province, Thailand, considered as another main pier of Nonthaburi, apart from Pak Kret Pier.

Description

It is a last stop for the all boats of Chao Phraya Express Boat (except green flag boat only). There is also a cross-river ferry service to Nonthaburi's Bang Si Mueang side.

The pier is located next to Nonthaburi Clock Tower and the Old Nonthaburi City Hall, which is the whole teak antique building built since King Rama VI's reign. Presently, it has become a provincial museum and registered as an ancient monument by the Fine Arts Department.

The area around pier has restaurants, coffee shops, bakeries, banks service, clothes shops and market etc. include as a terminal of many bus routes as well.

In addition, the Chao Phraya River flows through the pier, making it the place where the annual King’s Cup regatta take place around the mid year.

Transportation
Chao Phraya Express Boat: all boat routes 
BMTA bus: route 30, 32, 63, 64, 65, 97, 114, 117, 175, 203, 367 (commuter bus), 506, 545, 6028 (commuter bus)
Songthaew: route 1 (Circle route Nonthaburi - Sanambin Nam), 1 Kei truck (Nonthaburi pier - WAT Chomphu Wek), 3 (Nonthaburi pier - WAT Sangkathan-Bangphai Soi 5), 4 (Nonthaburi pier - WAT Bot bon), 5 (Nonthaburi pier - WAT Sai), 10 (Nonthaburi pier - Cluster Ville Ratchaphruek), 1024B Blue roof (Rama 5 - Bang bua thong), 1053 (Nonthaburi pier - WAT Salikho Phirataram), 6162 (Nonthaburi pier - WAT Chalo), 17002 (Soi Pracharat 26 Yak 1 - Central Rattanathibet)

References

External links
Chao Phraya Express Boat

Buildings and structures in Nonthaburi province
Chao Phraya Express Boat piers